The 2002 South American Race Walking Championships were held in Puerto Saavedra, Chile, on September 14–15, 2002.  The event was also known as South American Race Walking Cup.

A short note on the event and an appraisal of the results was given by Eduardo Biscayart for the IAAF.

Complete results were published.  The junior events are documented on the World Junior Athletics History webpages.

Medallists

Results

Men's 20km

Team 20km Men

Men's 35km

Men's 10km Junior (U20)

Men's 10km Youth (U18)

Team 10km Men Youth (U18)

Women's 20km

Team 20km Women

Women's 10km Junior (U20)

Team 10km Women Junior (U20)

Women's 5km Youth (U18)

Team 5km Women Youth (U18)

Participation
The participation of 83 athletes from 9 countries is reported.

 (8)
 (5)
 (16)
 (24)
 (6)
 (19)
 (1)
 Perú (3)
 (1)

See also
 2002 Race Walking Year Ranking

References

South American Race Walking Championships
South American Race Walking Championships
International athletics competitions hosted by Chile
South American Race Walking Championships
September 2002 sports events in South America